El Tarra is a Colombian municipality and town located in the department of Norte de Santander.

References
  Government of Norte de Santander - El Tarra
  El Tarra official website 

Municipalities of the Norte de Santander Department